The Little Seal River is a river in northern Cochrane District in Northeastern Ontario, Canada. It is part of the James Bay drainage basin, and is a right tributary of the Kesagami River.

The river begins in unnamed muskeg, flows northeast then northwest, and reaches its mouth at the Kesagami River, just upstream of the mouth of the Seal River. The Kesagami River flows via the Harricana River to James Bay.

See also
List of rivers of Ontario

References

Sources

Rivers of Cochrane District